John Baker (born 18 May 1933) is an English former first-class cricketer. He was a right-handed batsman who bowled right-arm medium pace.

Baker made his first-class debut for Somerset in the 1952 County Championship against Lancashire. From 1952 to 1954, he represented Somerset in nine first-class matches, with his final match for the county coming against Warwickshire. In his nine matches he scored 105 runs at a batting average of 10.50, with a highest score of 26 not out.

In 1955, Baker made his first-class debut for Oxford University against Yorkshire. During 1955, he played five first-class matches for the university, with his final first-class match coming against Worcestershire. In his five matches he scored 221 runs at an average of 36.83, with a single half-century of 91 not out against Free Foresters. With the ball, he took seven wickets at a bowling average of 28.42, with best figures of 2/26.

Baker played an additional first-class match for the Combined Services in 1956 against Glamorgan.

Baker made his debut for Dorset in the 1960 Minor Counties Championship against Berkshire. He represented Dorset in 100 Minor Counties Championship matches from 1960 to 1971, his final match coming against Oxfordshire. In 1968, he played his only List-A match for Dorset against Bedfordshire in the 1968 Gillette Cup.
John died in 2015 aged 81 in Blandford Forum Dorset.

External links
John Baker at Cricinfo
John Baker at CricketArchive
Matches and detailed statistics for John Baker

1933 births
Living people
People from Weston-super-Mare
English cricketers
Somerset cricketers
Oxford University cricketers
Dorset cricketers
Combined Services cricketers
Alumni of Jesus College, Oxford